Michelle Louise Chandler (born 16 July 1974) is a retired basketball player from Australia, who played for the Melbourne Tigers. She was a member of the national women's team that won the bronze medal at the 1996 Summer Olympics in Atlanta, Georgia. She attended the Australian Institute of Sport in 1992. Her married name is Michelle Cleary.

See also
 List of Australian WNBA players

References

External links
 

1974 births
Living people
Australian women's basketball players
Basketball players at the 1996 Summer Olympics
Olympic basketball players of Australia
Olympic bronze medalists for Australia
Sportspeople from Geelong
Melbourne Tigers players
Olympic medalists in basketball
Australian Institute of Sport basketball (WNBL) players
Medalists at the 1996 Summer Olympics